Wat's Dyke is a  linear earthwork running through the northern Welsh Marches from Basingwerk Abbey on the River Dee estuary, passing east of Oswestry and on to Maesbury in Shropshire, England. It now appears insignificant, sometimes a raised hedgerow and in other places is now no more than a cropmark, the ditch long since filled in and the bank ploughed away, but originally it was a considerable construction,  considered to be strategically more sophisticated than Offa's Dyke. The date of construction is disputed, ranging from sub-Roman to the early ninth century.

Construction and siting
It consists of the usual bank and ditch of an ancient dyke, with the ditch on the western side, meaning that the dyke faces Wales and by implication can be seen as protecting the English lands to the east. The placement of the dyke in the terrain also shows that care was taken to provide clear views to the west and to use local features to the best defensive advantage.

Dating controversy
The dyke was previously thought to date to the early 8th century, constructed by Æthelbald, king of Mercia, who reigned from 716 to 757. Æthelbald's successor, Offa, built the dyke which carries his name at some point during his reign (757 to 796).

The dating of the fire site and hence the dyke has been disputed, and it has been suggested that owing to the difficulties inherent in radiocarbon dating, this single date cannot be fully trusted and also that the dyke could easily have been built on top of the fire site at a later date.

Excavations in 2006 suggested a much later date of 792–852, and the earlier date is now thought to relate to a fire site of a sub-Roman earthwork which preceded the actual dyke. It has been tentatively suggested that the likely context for construction is in the 820s, when the Mercian king Coenwulf was fighting against a resurgent Welsh threat.

Wat's Dyke Way
It was opened in 2007.

See also

 Wansdyke, a similar earthwork created during sub-Roman decades in Wiltshire and Somerset
 Scots' Dike, a  linear earthwork constructed in 1552 to mark the division of the Debatable Lands and thereby settle the exact boundary between the Kingdoms of Scotland and England, on the Anglo-Scottish border
 Black Pig's Dyke in Ireland
 Broadclough Dykes in Lancashire

References

Further reading
Blake, Steve and Scott, Lloyd (2003): The Keys to Avalon: The True Location of Arthur’s Kingdom Revealed. Revised Edition, published by Rider.
Hannaford, H. R. (1998): "Archaeological Excavations on Wat’s Dyke at Maes-y-Clawdd," Archaeology Service, Shropshire County Council, report no. 132, December 1997.
Worthington, Margaret (1997): '"Wat’s Dyke: An Archaeological and Historical Enigma," Bulletin John Rylands Library, Manchester, Vol 79, no. 3, 1997. Reprinted in Offa's Dyke Journal, vol. 1, 2019, pp. 58–79

External links

www.geograph.co.uk – photos of Wat's Dyke today

Anglo-Saxon sites in England
Anglo-Saxon sites in Wales
Archaeological sites in Powys
Fortifications in England
Fortifications in Wales
History of Shropshire
Archaeological sites in Shropshire
England–Wales border
Ancient dikes
Fortification lines
Scheduled monuments in Flintshire
Linear earthworks